Timashev is a Russian masculine surname, its feminine counterpart is Timasheva. Notable people with the surname include:

Sergey Timashev (born 1937), Russian scientist
Ratmir Timashev (born 1966), Russian IT entrepreneur

Russian-language surnames